The 2009 Asian Junior Badminton Championships is an Asia continental junior championships to crown the best U-19 badminton players across Asia. This tournament were held in Kuala Lumpur, Malaysia from 12–19 July.

Venue
This tournament were held at Stadium Juara in Kuala Lumpur.

Medalists

Medal table

References

External links
Team Event at Tournamentsoftware.com
Individual Event at Tournamentsoftware.com

Badminton Asia Junior Championships
Asian Junior Badminton Championships
Asian Junior Badminton Championships
International sports competitions hosted by Malaysia
2009 in youth sport